Reader's Digest Guide to Love and Sex is a 1998 sex manual edited by Amanda Roberts and Barbara Padgett-Yawn and published by Reader's Digest. The book contains graphs, charts, and diagrams.

References

1998 non-fiction books
Sex manuals
Reader's Digest